Libor Kozák (born 30 May 1989) is a Czech professional footballer who plays as a striker for Trinity Zlín.

Club career

SFC Opava
Kozák started his career in 2001 with Czech club Slezský FC Opava, first playing with its youth teams before being promoted to the first team in 2007. Considered a promising talent, Kozák was a prolific goalscorer in the Czech Second Division with Opava. In October 2007, he scored his first hat-trick, coming in a 5–1 Opava win against FC Zenit Čáslav in the second division.

In January 2008, Kozák went on trial with English Premier League club Portsmouth, however he did not join Pompey. At the end of the season, Italian giants Lazio came calling and Kozák accepted a move to Rome.

Lazio
Kozák joined Lazio in July 2008, signing a five-year contract, with rumours that Lazio club president Claudio Lotito paid a €1.2 million ($1.8 million) transfer fee.

Kozák made his Serie A debut on 2 May 2009, coming on as a substitute for Mauro Zárate in the 84th minute against Inter at the San Siro. Lazio lost the match 0–2.

After a season at Lazio, the club loaned him to Serie B side Brescia for the 2009–10 season, to gain experience and regular playing time. On 26 September 2009, Kozák scored his first goal in Italy against Grosseto.

At the end of his loan spell, he returned to Lazio. He scored his first goal for the Biancocelesti on 18 September 2010 which turned out to be the winner against Fiorentina. On 16 January 2011, he netted the deciding goal against Sampdoria before registering his third and fourth goals for Lazio two weeks later, against Fiorentina once again. Having achieved four goals in nine starts for Lazio of which four goals came in January, Michal Bílek, manager of the Czech Republic, suggested Kozak would be called up to the national team and announced he would be make a special trip to the Stadio Olimpico to watch his game against A.S. Bari.

In the 2012–13 season Kozák, under coach Vladimir Petković, experienced a two-faced season failing to score in 19 appearances in Serie A, but finishing the season as the leading goal scorer in the Europa League with 8 goals. He scored his first club hat trick against VfB Stuttgart in Rome on 14 March 2013, helping his team reach the last eight by an aggregate score of 5–1.

Aston Villa
On 2 September 2013, Kozák signed a four-year deal with English side Aston Villa for €6.5 million transfer fee, being assigned the number 27 shirt. On 14 September 2013, he made his Aston Villa debut at Villa Park, but couldn't prevent the side from losing 2–1 to Newcastle United. On 21 September 2013, he scored his first goal for Villa, seconds after replacing Christian Benteke, against Norwich City which proved to be the winning goal in a 1–0 victory. On 9 November 2013, he scored his second Villa goal with a header in a 2–0 victory against Cardiff City. On 4 December 2013, he scored the second goal in a 3–2 victory over Southampton. On 21 December 2013, he scored the only goal for Villa in a 2–1 loss to Stoke City at the Britannia Stadium.

On 2 January 2014 Villa announced that Kozak had broken his right leg in a training ground collision with teammate Ciaran Clark, and would miss the rest of the 2013–14 season. Complications and further injuries saw him miss the entire 2014–15 season as well. He eventually made his come back 15 months after the initial leg break in March 2015 in an under-21 match against Wolverhampton Wanderers. He made his first team comeback in July 2015 in a 3–1 pre-season defeat to Fulham, in which he scored for the first time since December 2013. In February 2017, with Kozak's contract running out at the end of season, Aston Villa announced that he would miss the rest of the season undergoing surgery on his ankle.

Kozák was released by Aston Villa at the end of the 2016–17 season.

Bari
On 30 August 2017, Kozak joined Serie B team Bari.

Livorno 
On 16 July 2018, Kozák signed with Livorno.

Sparta Prague 
On 28 May 2019, Kozák signed with Sparta Prague.

Puskás Akadémia 
In the summer of 2021, Kozák joined Puskás Akadémia in the Hungarian Nemzeti Bajnokság I.

Slovácko 
On 17 June 2022, Kozák signed with Slovácko.

Trinity Zlín 
On 13 January 2023, Kozák signed with Trinity Zlín.

International career
Kozák played for the Czech under-21 team, representing the team at the 2011 UEFA European Under-21 Football Championship.

Kozák received his first call up for the senior Czech national team on 15 March 2011, when coach Michal Bílek selected him in his squad to take on Spain and Liechtenstein, however Kozák did not make his senior international debut.

Career statistics

Club

International

Scores and results list the Czech Republic's goal tally first.

Honours

Club
Lazio
Coppa Italia: 2008–09, 2012–13

International
Czech Republic U21 
UEFA European Under-21 Championship bronze: 2011

Individual
UEFA Europa League top scorer: 2012–13

References

External links
 
 
 

1989 births
Living people
Sportspeople from Opava
Czech footballers
Czech Republic youth international footballers
Czech Republic under-21 international footballers
Association football forwards
SFC Opava players
S.S. Lazio players
Brescia Calcio players
Aston Villa F.C. players
S.S.C. Bari players
U.S. Livorno 1915 players
FC Slovan Liberec players
AC Sparta Prague players
Serie A players
Serie B players
Premier League players
Czech First League players
Czech expatriate footballers
Expatriate footballers in Italy
Expatriate footballers in England
Czech Republic international footballers
Czech expatriate sportspeople in Italy
Czech expatriate sportspeople in England
Puskás Akadémia FC players
Expatriate footballers in Hungary
Czech expatriate sportspeople in Hungary
Nemzeti Bajnokság I players
1. FC Slovácko players
FC Fastav Zlín players